Alexander Vladimirovich Shcherbakov (born 12 March 1965) is a Russian politician. He has represented Vladivostok constituency in the State Duma since 2021.

Electoral record 

|-
! colspan=2 style="background-color:#E9E9E9;text-align:left;vertical-align:top;" |Candidate
! style="background-color:#E9E9E9;text-align:left;vertical-align:top;" |Party
! style="background-color:#E9E9E9;text-align:right;" |Votes
! style="background-color:#E9E9E9;text-align:right;" |%
|-
|style="background-color:"|
|align=left|Aleksandr Shcherbakov
|align=left|United Russia
|
|34.59%
|-
|style="background-color:"|
|align=left|Artyom Samsonov
|align=left|Communist Party
|
|22.40%
|-
|style="background-color:"|
|align=left|Andrey Andreychenko
|align=left|Liberal Democratic Party
|
|10.09%
|-
|style="background-color: " |
|align=left|Vitaly Libanov
|align=left|Communists of Russia
|
|7.83%
|-
|style="background-color: " |
|align=left|Maksim Beloborodov
|align=left|A Just Russia — For Truth
|
|7.22%
|-
|style="background-color:"|
|align=left|Oleg Nisenbaum
|align=left|Party of Pensioners
|
|4.75%
|-
|style="background-color:"|
|align=left|Sergey Matlin
|align=left|Party of Growth
|
|2.29%
|-
|style="background-color:"|
|align=left|Darya Sapronova
|align=left|The Greens
|
|2.18%
|-
|style="background-color:"|
|align=left|Svetlana Petropavlova
|align=left|Rodina
|
|1.50%
|-
|style="background-color:"|
|align=left|Aleksandr Filkov
|align=left|Russian Party of Freedom and Justice
|
|1.30%
|-
| colspan="5" style="background-color:#E9E9E9;"|
|- style="font-weight:bold"
| colspan="3" style="text-align:left;" | Total
| 
| 100%
|-
| colspan="5" style="background-color:#E9E9E9;"|
|- style="font-weight:bold"
| colspan="4" |Source:
|
|}

References 

1965 births
Living people
21st-century Russian politicians
United Russia politicians
Politicians from Vladivostok